Ajeet Shankar Rai (born 18 January 1999) is a New Zealand professional tennis player.

Rai has a career-high ATP singles ranking of 514, achieved on 12 December 2022, and a best doubles ranking of 378, reached on 7 November 2022.

Tennis career

2018
Rai's first experience of professional tennis was being given a wildcard into qualifying for the Auckland Open, where he was beaten by Taro Daniel in the first round. He played his first senior ITF tournament in Kampala, Uganda, in May, qualifying for the main draw in singles, where he reached the second round. The following week, at the same venue, he was given a wildcard into both doubles and the main draw for singles, and reached the quarterfinals of both.

He reached his first doubles semifinal in China in July, but the highlight of his year to that date would come in September, when he made his Davis Cup debut for New Zealand, partnering Artem Sitak to win their doubles rubber against South Korea, giving Rai a perfect start to his senior international representative career. His first ITF doubles final came in Hua Hin, Thailand, in October, where he and Karunuday Singh lost in a match tie-break to the top seeds, Francis Casey Alcantara and Sonchat Ratiwatana. In singles at the same tournament, he progressed past the quarterfinals for the first time, going all the way to take the title over Manish Sureshkumar in three sets. His season finished with a couple of quarterfinal losses in Futures events in Tây Ninh, Vietnam.

2019
Again given a wildcard into qualifying in Auckland, Rai was a game away from defeating Roberto Marcora in the first round before eventually losing in three sets. He and New Zealand junior champion George Stoupe were given a wild card into the doubles, where they lost in the first round to Artem Sitak and Austin Krajicek.

In Uganda on the anniversary of his ITF debut, Rai injured his back severely enough in his second event to need three months' rehabilitation before he returned to the tour in South-East Asia. Well-beaten in his first match, he steadily improved through a series of tournaments to reach another doubles final in Hua Hin in August. By the worst possible luck, his partner, former dual Australian Open junior doubles winner Bradley Mousley, injured his knee in his singles semifinal earlier in the day and had to retire from that match. He played the doubles final, but with very restricted movement the pair were easily beaten by the top-seeded Ratiwatana twins from the host country.

Rai reached two more ITF doubles finals before the end of the year, in Hua Hin two weeks later and in Cancún, Mexico, in late November, finishing runner-up on each occasion.

2020
With the ITF Circuit returning to New Zealand for the first time in several years, Rai's first event for 2020 was at the new tournament in Te Anau, where he lost in the quarter-finals of both singles and doubles.  At the ASB Classic in Auckland, Rai received a wildcard into both the singles qualifying rounds and the doubles, losing his first match in both. The doubles defeat, however, came at the hands of the eventual champions, Luke Bambridge and Ben McLachlan, and Rai and partner Mackenzie McDonald played extremely well.

Rai's next stop after Auckland was Cancún, where he played three tournaments in as many weeks. The second was the most productive, reaching the quarterfinals in singles and finally securing a doubles title, in his fifth final. Rai then returned home for New Zealand's Davis Cup tie against Venezuela in Auckland, where he lost in singles to Luis David Martínez in three sets. He didn't play again before the international tour was suspended due to the Covid-19 pandemic, and his only subsequent events were domestic tournaments such as the New Zealand Premier League, Wellington Open/New Zealand Championships (where he finished runner-up) and the Te Anau Invitational.

2021
Rai resumed his international career in June, playing a series of ITF tournaments in Monastir over the next couple of months. He reached several doubles finals but, frustratingly, it took five attempts before he was able to win another title.  Apart from a brief trip to Spain to renew his visa, he stayed in Monastir until November, eventually winning six doubles titles from 11 finals before returning to New Zealand.

2022
2022 had to be considered a successful year for Rai, as he made three more ITF singles finals, winning the last of them at the first of two new tournaments in his home country.  He also took the doubles title in his very first ATP Challenger event.

ATP Challenger and ITF Circuit finals

Singles: 4 (2 titles, 2 runners-up)

Note 1: this was an outdoor tournament, but several matches, including the final, were played indoors due to bad weather.

Doubles: 19 (9 titles, 10 runners-up)

Davis Cup (3)

   indicates the outcome of the Davis Cup match followed by the score, date, place of event, the zonal classification and its phase, and the court surface.

External links

1999 births
Living people
New Zealand male tennis players
New Zealand sportspeople of Indian descent
New Zealand sportspeople
Indian emigrants to New Zealand